The 2012 Dublin Senior Hurling Championship was a Dublin-based GAA club competition between the top clubs in Dublin Hurling.  Kilmacud Crokes won the senior hurling final by beating Cuala by 2-10 to 0-09.

Round robin

Group A

Group B

Group C

Group D

Knockout stages

References

Dublin Senior Hurling Championship
Dublin Senior Hurling Championship